Drakolimni ("Dragon Lake") is the name of several alpine or sub-alpine lakes in northwestern Greece Epirus region: the ones in mountain Tymfi and Smolikas are the most widely known. According to local folktales the lakes used to be inhabited by dragons who fought each other by throwing pines and rocks and thus created the peculiar landscape and gave their names to the lakes.

Drakolimni of Tymfi 
The first lake resides at an altitude of 2050m above sea level, on the mountain range of Tymfi, in Vikos–Aoös National Park. It is overlooked by the nearby peaks of Ploskos (Greek: Πλόσκος) and Astraka (Greek: Αστράκα). At 5 hours walking distance from the village of Papingo, the lake is a popular trekking destination in the Vikos–Aoös National Park. The lake is inhabited by a species of alpine newt.

Drakolimni of Smolikas 
The second lake resides on the west slope of Smolikas, the second highest mountain of Greece. Smolikas lies a few kilometers north of Tymfi, only separated by the gorge of the river Aoos. This lake is also inhabited by alpine newt.

Footnotes 

Mountain lakes
Lakes of Greece
Landforms of Ioannina (regional unit)
Zagori
Landforms of Epirus (region)